Connor Williams may refer to:

 Connor Williams (cricketer) (born 1973), Indian cricketer
 Connor Williams (Canadian football) (born 1991), Canadian football defensive lineman for the Ottawa Redblacks
 Connor Williams (American football) (born 1997), American football lineman for the Dallas Cowboys
 Connor Williams (rugby league) (born 1998), rugby league player